1899 is a multilingual German period mystery-science fiction television series created by Jantje Friese and Baran bo Odar. It premiered on Netflix on 17 November 2022 and received generally favorable reviews. The series was cancelled in January 2023.

Premise 
Set in 1899, the series follows a group of European emigrants travelling from Southampton, UK on a steamship named Kerberos to start new lives in New York City, US.

Cast and characters

Main 
 Emily Beecham as Maura Henriette Franklin/Singleton, a neurologist and one of the first female doctors in the UK, travelling alone to America
 Aneurin Barnard as Daniel Solace, a mysterious man who boards the Kerberos.
 Andreas Pietschmann as Eyk Larsen, the ship's weather-beaten captain 
 Miguel Bernardeau as Ángel, a wealthy Spaniard traveling with Ramiro
 José Pimentão as Ramiro, a faux Portuguese priest traveling with Ángel
 Isabella Wei as Ling Yi, a mysterious young woman from Hong Kong, traveling with Yuk Je 
 Gabby Wong as Yuk Je, a middle-aged woman from Hong Kong traveling with Ling Yi 
  as Jérôme, a French stowaway
 Mathilde Ollivier as Clémence, a young woman from the Paris elite, accompanied by her new husband Lucien
 Jonas Bloquet as Lucien, an upper class Parisian, and former Lieutenant of the French Foreign Legion, newly married to his wife Clémence
 Rosalie Craig as Virginia Wilson, a sociable, wealthy British woman 
 Maciej Musiał as Olek, a Polish stoker on his way to New York
 Clara Rosager as Tove, a young pregnant Danish woman traveling to New York City with her family
 Lucas Lynggaard Tønnesen as Krester, a young Danish man with a mysterious scar on his face
 Maria Erwolter as Iben, a religious Dane traveling with her husband Anker and children, who supposedly hears the voice of God 
 Alexandre Willaume as Anker, a religious Dane going to New York with his wife Iben, his son Krester, and his daughters Tove and Ada
 Tino Mewes as Sebastian, the first mate on the Kerberos
 Isaak Dentler as Franz, the captain's right-hand man
 Fflyn Edwards as Elliot, a.k.a. "the boy", a mysterious mute boy found under unusual circumstances, who becomes Maura's charge on board the Kerberos.
 Anton Lesser as Henry Singleton, a British investor and Maura's father

Recurring 
 Vida Sjørslev as Ada, Krester and Tove's younger sister
 Alexander Owen as Landon, a stoker and friend of Darrel
 Ben Ashenden as Darrel, a stoker and friend of Landon
 Richard Hope as Dr. Reginald Murray, a boorish British doctor 
 Joshua Jaco Seelenbinder as Eugen, an officer on the Kerberos
 Niklas Maienschein as Wilhelm, the telegraph operator on the Kerberos
 Jónas Alfreð Birkisson as Einar, a third class passenger from Norway and mutineer
 Heidi Toini as Bente, a third class passenger

Guest 
 Cloé Heinrich as Nina Larsen, Eyk's daughter 
 Alexandra Gottschlich as Sara Larsen, Eyk's wife
 Kaja Chan as Mei Mei, Ling Yi's friend in Hong Kong
 Martin Greis as Villads, the landowner that employed Anker's family

Episodes

Production

Development

On 13 November 2018, it was announced that Dark creators Jantje Friese and Baran bo Odar were developing the project for Netflix under their overall deal  at the streaming service. The series was confirmed to be moving forward two weeks later during a Netflix press conference showcasing European original programming. By July 2020, bo Odar revealed via Instagram that Friese had completed writing the script for the pilot episode, titled "The Ship." During an interview with Deadline Hollywood, Friese explained how the European migrant crisis and Brexit were influential to the series, saying:

As with Dark, Friese served as the head writer of the show. The staff writing team comprised writers of different nationalities including Emma Ko (from Hong Kong and the UK), Coline Abert (from France), Jerome Bucchan-Nelson (from the UK), Juliana Lima Dehne (from Brazil and the US), Joshua Long (from the US), Darío Madrona (from Spain), and Emil Nygaard Albertsen (from Denmark). According to director Baran bo Odar, all scripts were first written in English, then the non-English sections were translated by the staff writers and/or translators. Odar had phonetic copies of the script on set, and language assistants were present during filming to ensure the accuracy of the dialogue.

Friese and bo Odar have ideas for two more seasons, with increased complexity compared to season 1. The planned three-season structure stems from Friese's and bo Odar's film background, where films have three acts. The first season served to establish the theme and characters and pose big questions. If ordered by Netflix, the second season would explain the symbology of the triangles, and Maura's brother would be an important character. bo Odar described this second act as "all about the fun and games, where you play with the theme, and maybe get a little bit more megalomaniacal and crazy, and then resolve it in the third season into a hopefully satisfying resolution."

Budget
The budget for the series was at least €60 million ($62.2 million) with €2 million coming from Medienboard Berlin-Brandenburg, €10 million coming from the German Motion Picture Fund, and Netflix investing €48 million in the project. 1899 is the most expensive German television series of all time.

Casting
On 16 December 2020, it was announced that Emily Beecham was cast in the lead role. On 2 May 2021, Aneurin Barnard, Andreas Pietschmann, Miguel Bernardeau, Maciej Musiał, Anton Lesser, Lucas Lynggaard Tønnesen, Rosalie Craig, Clara Rosager, Maria Erwolter, Yann Gael, Mathilde Ollivier, José Pimentão, Isabella Wei, Gabby Wong, Jonas Bloquet, Fflyn Edwards, and Alexandre Willaume were added to the cast, with each character speaking in the actor's native language.

Filming

Pre-production for the series officially commenced on 24 November 2020, with a week-long lens test shoot taking place. The series was initially scheduled to begin principal photography on 1 February 2021, but was later pushed back by 3 months. Filming officially began on 3 May 2021 at Studio Babelsberg in Potsdam, the only designated UNESCO Creative City of Film in Germany.

The series was shot in a new virtual production stage called Volume, operated by bo Odar and Friese's sister company Dark Bay, at Studio Babelsberg. Filming also took place in London, United Kingdom. Creative studio Framestore provided visual effects for the series. Filming wrapped in November 2021 with Baran bo Odar posting on Instagram.

Release 
1899 had a two-episode premiere on 47th Toronto International Film Festival on 12 September 2022. The series launched on Netflix on 17 November 2022, along with a companion making-of documentary titled Making 1899.

Netflix announced a few days after release that 1899 was in 58 countries the most watched product of all the offerings available on Netflix at that time. Despite this, on 2 January 2023, the show was cancelled.

Cancellation and response 
Writing in Forbes about the cancellation of 1899 and other Netflix series, Paul Tassi said that "I feel like Netflix is almost actively stealing my time from me. [...] It's frankly exhausting, and if it's this exhausting for viewers, I have to imagine it's ten times as much for showrunners and actors. Netflix is becoming a graveyard stacked with dead series with unfinished conclusions. [...] Something has to change."

Writing in Digital Spy, David Opie said that "for all we know, there might be talks to save the show at HBO or Prime Video, plus there's a small chance that Netflix themselves might try and wrap things up in a one-off special or movie. That's exactly what happened after fans decried Netflix's decision to cancel Sense8 a few years back [that is also an international genre show]."

Fans took to social media to decry the decision and a petition to save the show was started on Change.org. As of 23 January 2023, it had garnered over 87,149 signatures.

Reception

Audience viewership 
During its debut week, 1899 ranked at number two on Netflix's Top 10 TV English titles just three days after its release with 79.27 million hours viewed. The following week, the series remained at the same position and garnered 87.89 million viewing hours. In its third week, the series generated 44.62 million viewing hours, while also holding its position at number two.

Critical response 
The series received generally positive reviews. On Rotten Tomatoes, it holds a "Certified Fresh" approval rating of 79% based on 28 reviews, with an average rating of 6.80/10. The website's critical consensus states, "1899 navigates its multicultural passengers through an atmospheric mystery and delivers a suspenseful journey, even if it may never reach a satisfying destination." On Metacritic, which uses a weighted average, the series has a score of 66 out of 100 based on 12 critic reviews, indicating "generally favorable reviews".

Collider named 1899 as one of the best new TV shows of 2022, while MovieWeb ranked it the sixth best TV show of the year.

Accolades

References

External links
 
 
 Screenplay of Episode 1 "The Ship"

2020s German drama television series
2022 German television series debuts
English-language Netflix original programming
Epic television series
French-language Netflix original programming
German drama television series
German horror fiction television series
German supernatural television series
German-language Netflix original programming
Television series about immigration
Polish-language Netflix original programming
Productions using StageCraft
Spanish-language Netflix original programming
Fiction set in 1899
Television series set in the 1890s
Television shows filmed in Germany
Television shows set in London
Television shows set in New York City
Television shows shot in London
Works about immigration to the United States